Matti Sarfati Harkavi (born 1962) is an Israeli politician who currently serves as a member of the Knesset for Yesh Atid.

Biography
Sarfati Harkavi earned a BSc and PhD from the Hebrew University of Jerusalem and worked as a plant geneticist at Hazera Genetics. She became mayor of Yoav Regional Council in 2011, and was re-elected unopposed in the 2018 municipal elections.

Prior to the 2022 Knesset elections Sarfati Harkavi was placed eighteenth on the Yesh Atid list. She was elected to the Knesset as the party won 24 seats.

References

External links

Living people
1962 births
Hebrew University of Jerusalem alumni
Mayors of places in Israel
Yesh Atid politicians
Members of the 25th Knesset (2022–)
Women members of the Knesset
Jewish Israeli politicians